In 1033, following their conquest of the city from the Maghrawa tribe, the forces of Tamim, chief of the Zenata Berber Banu Ifran tribe, perpetrated a massacre of Jews in Fez in an anti-Jewish pogrom. The city of Fez in Morocco had been contested between the Zenata Berber tribes of Miknasa, Maghrawa and Banu Ifran for the previous half century, in the aftermath of the fall of the Idrisid dynasty.

Tamim's forces killed over six thousand Jews, appropriated their belongings, and captured the Jewish women of the city. The killings took place in the month of Jumaada al-Akhir 424 AH (May–June 1033 AD). The killings have been called a "pogrom" by some recent writers. Sometime in the period 1038-1040 the Maghrawa tribe retook Fez, forcing Tamīm to flee to Salé.

See also
Timeline of Jewish History
Timeline of antisemitism
Moroccan Jews

References

Anti-Jewish pogroms by Muslims
Medieval anti-Jewish pogroms
1033
11th-century massacres
11th century in Morocco
Antisemitism in Morocco
Fez, Morocco
Massacres in Morocco
Judaism in Fez